"Push It" is the first single from the heavy metal band Static-X's first album, Wisconsin Death Trip. "Push It" is one of Static-X's best known and most popular songs. It is  credited, along with "I'm with Stupid", for making Wisconsin Death Trip Static-X's best-selling album.

Music video 
The music video for "Push It" was directed by Mick Olszewski and introduces shots of clay animation creatures similar to those found in Tool videos, interspersed with the band performing.

Track listing
"Push It" - 2:35
"Bled for Days (Live)" - 4:09
"Push It (JB's Death Trance Mix)" - 3:32
"Down (Previously Unreleased)" - 3:14
"Push It (Mephisto Odyssey Crucified Dub Mix)" - 6:10

Charts

References

1999 debut singles
Static-X songs
1999 songs
Songs written by Tony Campos
Songs written by Ken Jay
Songs written by Wayne Static
Songs written by Koichi Fukuda

Nu metal songs